Annabel Palma is an American politician and Commissioner and Chair of the New York City Commission on Human Rights. She previously served  on the New York City Council from the 18th district from 2004 to 2017. She is a Democrat. The district includes Castle Hill, Clason Point, Hunts Point, Parkchester, Soundview, West Farms and Westchester Square in The Bronx.

Life and career
Palma is a lifelong resident of The Bronx and attended public schools in the borough before receiving her Certified Nursing Assistant certification from Bronx Community College. She served as a union representative in 1994 while earning an associate degree in Business Administration from Monroe College.

Palma is a resident of Parkchester where she resides with her husband and her son, Jonathan, who is currently a student at John Jay College of Criminal Justice.

New York City Council
In 2003, Palma was elected after defeating incumbent Pedro Espada, Jr. handily in a primary.  She would win re-election in 2005, 2009 and 2013 easily.

Palma serves on the Committees on Youth Services, General Welfare, Technology, Land Use, Community Development and the Subcommittee on Landmarks, Public Siting and Maritime Uses, and is a member of the Black, Latino and Asian Caucus and Women’s Caucus.  She has come under fire for frequent absences from official council duties.

References

External links
Annabel Palma - New York City Council
Annabel Palma (official Facebook page)

New York City Council members
Year of birth missing (living people)
Living people
New York (state) Democrats
Monroe College alumni
Politicians from the Bronx
Place of birth missing (living people)
Women New York City Council members
21st-century American politicians
21st-century American women politicians
Bronx Community College alumni